The battle of Colonia del Sacramento (or Colônia do Sacramento) consisted of a series of failed attempts made by admiral William Brown of capturing the town of Colonia del Sacramento, which was under Brazilian control and being sieged on land by insurgent Uruguayan forces, in the context of the Cisplatine War between the Empire of Brazil and the United Provinces of the Río de la Plata. The confrontations began in the morning of 26 February 1826 and ended on 14 March 1826.

Background
The walled town of Colonia del Sacramento was a strategic point for the Brazilians due to its proximity to the city of Buenos Aires, capital of the United Provinces, which was suffering a naval blockade by the Imperial Brazilian Navy. The Brazilians used its port as a hub for resupplying ships in the Río de la Plata and thus continue on blockading the port of Buenos Aires. For this reason, the town was defended by a local garrison in the fort and batteries, and 4 small vessels: the brig Real Pedro, the brigantine Pará and the schooners Liberdade do Sul and Conceição.

Brown then decided to launch a surprise attack on the Brazilian fleet, setting sail at noon that day.

The initial plan was to attack the Brazilian fleet at night, but due to an error, the Argentines lost the surprise and the Brazilians, perceiving the enemy approach, quickly sailed away. Brown decided not to chase them and instead went north for a combined attack on Colonia del Sacramento, which was being sieged on land by a 400 men detachment of Juan Antonio Lavalleja's army, commanded by Ramón Cáceres. Brown reached Colonia del Sacramento on the evening of 25 February 1826, anchoring his ships out of the reach of the town's fortress cannons, and sent an envoy with a request calling on for the Brazilian commander, brigadier Manuel Jorge Rodrigues, a veteran of the Peninsular War, to surrender.

The request read:

To which Rodrigues replied:

Frigate captain Frederico Mariath, the commander of the Brazilian ships in Colonia del Sacramento, had convened a council to decide how the defence of the town should be carried out. Mariath suggested that his four ships be anchored under the protection of the bastions of Carmen and Santa Rita, with their sides facing the port, as to provide fire support. This proposal was accepted by Jorge Rodrigues. Eight of the ships' cannons were disembarked to form two batteries on land: one was placed at the Tambor bastion, in order to protect the ships and to prevent the Argentines from disembarking on the town's mole, and the other was placed between the bastions of São Pedro and São Miguel. Four hours after having sent his envoy and upon receiving the answer, admiral Brown ordered his men to begin the attack on Colonia del Sacramento.

Order of battle

United Provinces

Empire of Brazil

Battle

Initial attack
At dawn on February 26 the Brazilians were already in position for the upcoming attack: Frederico Mariath was with Manuel Jorge Rodrigues in Tambor; the batteries of Santa Rita and São Pedro were commanded by lieutenants Antônio Leocádio do Couto and José Inácio de Santa Rita, respectively; the then young lieutenant Joaquim José Inácio was aboard one of the Brazilian ships.

The Argentine squadron began the approach from the southeast, exchanging heavy fire with the São Pedro bastion on land for more than two hours, during which the brig Belgrano broke away from its formation after crossing the islet of San Gabriel, running aground on the islet's east bank, dangerously close to the enemy batteries, which focused their fire on it. Despite the efforts to lift the Belgrano and the other vessels sent on its rescue, the ship was abandoned by its crew after a shot from Santa Rita killed its captain and put 17 of its men out of combat. At night admiral Brown signaled to stop the hostilities in order to gain some time and to send another envoy carrying a message to Jorge Rodrigues, in which Brown declared:

Manuel Jorge Rodrigues was not intimidated by the ultimatum and promptly replied:

The hostilities resumed and continued on for the rest of the night. Admiral Brown, convinced his larger ships were inappropriate to invest against Colonia del Sacramento for fear they could run aground, decided to leave, sailing away from the Brazilian batteries and anchoring his ships between the Hornos islands in order to wait for the arrival of the reinforcement of 6 gunboats, which were small enough to carry out a landing on Colonia del Sacramento.

That night, Mariath ordered the schooner Conceição to leave the port in order to set the Belgrano on fire, as he feared the high tide could make it float again. The schooner did not succeed in setting the Belgrano on fire, being chased by the Argentines, but still managed to escape and sail to Montevideo where it delivered news of the Argentine attack on Colonia del Sacramento to admiral Rodrigo Ferreira Lobo, commander of the Brazilian naval forces in the Río de la Plata.

Second attack
On the night of 1 March 1826, admiral Brown once again attacked Colonia del Sacramento, this time in a coordinated effort with Juan Antonio Lavalleja. The Argentines hoped the attack on land by the besieging forces would divide the Brazilians and make Brown's landing easier. A few days earlier, on 27 February 1826, Brown's fleet had been reinforced by the 6 gunboats he had requested and also a hospital ship: Pepa. Each gunboat had a crew of 30 men and was armed with a single cannon. Brown's goal was to set all the Brazilian ships on fire, with the exception of the Real Pedro, which he planned to capture in order to replace the Belgrano. From February 28 to March 1, 200 of Brown's men were selected and armed to disembark on Colonia del Sacramento. The men were divided into groups and given incendiary bottles and grog.

At 22:30 the 6 gunboats, together with two auxiliary boats, silently sailed towards the town. At 23:45, however, the Brazilians noticed the Argentine approach towards the mole and opened fire from the batteries. The crew of the Brazilian ships, upon hearing the shots, also opened fire against the Argentines. Espora and Rosales attacked them, but the remaining 4 gunboats were dragged close to the town's fort by the wind and the current, coming under fire by the bastions of Carmen and Tambor and also the Brazilians entrenched on the mole and its surroundings, which resulted in many casualties. The Argentines managed to board the brig Real Pedro and set it on fire, lighting up the night scene with a glare, but had to help the gunboats that ran aground near the mole, being subject to intense enemy fire. Jorge Rodrigues, knowing the control of the mole was crucial, personally marched on it commanding the Brazilians. 

The attack on land by the besieging forces commanded by Ramón Cáceres did not happen. Cáceres was ready and in position to attack the town, but received orders from Lavalleja at 21:00 not to attack it. Cáceres imagined Lavalleja had warned Brown about this order.

Before dawn, the Argentines gave up the attack and withdrew, abandoning the gunboats 4, 6 and 7, which were captured by the Brazilians. The Argentines suffered dozens of casualties, with some 40 soldiers and officers killed and 80 wounded. The attack cost the Brazilians 19 dead and 10 wounded and the loss of the Real Pedro, which was burned and destroyed.

Final actions
After the attack on March 1, Brown, in order to save ammunition and hoping for the aid of Lavalleja's troops, ordered his ships only to shoot 6 shots each during daytime and to practice assaults on the port at night, as to keep the Brazilians in constant state of alert. Lavalleja finally arrived on March 11 and presented himself aboard Brown's flagship, excusing himself for his previous lack of initiative and telling Brown he could count on his help with 1,700 men and 12 cannons to attack Colonia del Sacramento. However, concerned with Lavalleja's indecisiveness, Brown told him he had received orders on March 8 to abandon the attack.

Aftermath
Admiral Rodrigo Ferreira Lobo was replaced by Rodrigo Pinto Guedes, who reached Montevideo on March 12, but only assumed command of the Brazilian fleet in the Río de la Plata on May 12. Ferreira Lobo had earned the distrust and anger of both the Brazilian sailors in the theater of operations and the court in Rio de Janeiro due to his excessive passiveness and lack of initiative in dealing with the Argentines.

On 14 March, two days, therefore, after Pinto Guedes arrived in Montevideo, admiral Brown, fearing that the new Brazilian admiral would be more aggressive than his predecessor, decided to abandon the attack on Colonia del Sacramento, sailing back to Buenos Aires that same day. A Brazilian squadron consisting of 18 ships was stationed near the San Gabriel islet waiting for Brown in order to attack him, but he managed to sail past it, safely reaching Buenos Aires.

Notes

References

Citations

Bibliography
 
 
 
 
 
 

Conflicts in 1826
Colonia del Sacramento
1826 in Brazil
February 1826 events
March 1826 events
1826 in Argentina